Hocaoğlu is a Turkish surname. Notable people with the surname include:

Ece Hocaoğlu (born 1994), Turkish volleyball player
Hakkı Hocaoğlu (born 1975), Turkish football player
Meltem Hocaoğlu (born 1992), Turkish female karateka
Tuğçe Hocaoğlu (born 1988), Turkish female volleyball player

See also
 Hocaoğlu, Bartın
 Hocaoğlu, Düzce